Cambria is a Latin name for Wales.

Cambria may also refer to:

People 
 Fred Cambria (born 1948), American baseball player
 Joe Cambria (1890–1962), American baseball scout
 Paul Cambria, American attorney

Places

Canada 
 Cambria, Alberta
 Rural Municipality of Cambria No. 6, Saskatchewan, a rural municipality

South Africa 
Cambria, South Africa; see List of populated places in South Africa

United States 
Cambria, California 
Cambria, Illinois
Cambria, Indiana
Cambria, Iowa
Cambria, Michigan
Cambria, Minnesota
Cambria, New York
Cambria Heights, Queens, a neighborhood of New York City
Cambria, Pennsylvania
Cambria, West Virginia
Cambria, Wisconsin 
Cambria, Wyoming
Cambria County, Pennsylvania
 Cambria Township (disambiguation)

Ships 
 Cambria (yacht), a racing yacht
 MV Cambria, a ship that served the Dublin to Holyhead route from 1949 until the 1970s
 SB Cambria, a restored spritsail barge
 SS Cambria, various steamships
 USS Cambria (APA-36), a World War II-era transport of the US Navy

Other uses
 Cambria (company), an American producer of quartz surfaces
 Cambria Hotels, a brand under Choice Hotels International
 Cambria (journal)
 Cambria (typeface), a transitional serif typeface
 Cambria Killgannon, a character in The Amory Wars comic book series
 Cambria Press, an American academic publisher
 Cambria Productions, a defunct American animation production studio
 × Cambria, a commercial orchid name

See also
 Cambrian (disambiguation)
 Cambia (disambiguation), an unrelated word
 Coheed and Cambria, an American progressive-metal band
 Cumbia, a style of music and dance (unrelated word)
 Cumbria (disambiguation), etymologically related
 Cymric (disambiguation), etymologically related